In mathematics, particularly in the study of functions of several complex variables, Ushiki's theorem, named after S. Ushiki, states that certain well-behaved functions cannot have certain kinds of well-behaved invariant manifolds.

The theorem 
A biholomorphic mapping  cannot have a 1-dimensional compact smooth invariant manifold.  In particular, such a map cannot have a homoclinic connection or heteroclinic connection.

Commentary 
Invariant manifolds typically appear as solutions of certain asymptotic problems in dynamical systems.  The most common is the stable manifold or its kin, the unstable manifold.

The publication 
Ushiki's theorem was published in 1980. The theorem appeared in print again several years later, in a certain Russian journal, by an author apparently unaware of Ushiki's work.

An application 
The standard map cannot have a homoclinic or heteroclinic connection. The practical consequence is that one cannot show the existence of a Smale's horseshoe in this system by a perturbation method, starting from a homoclinic or heteroclinic connection. Nevertheless, one can show that Smale's horseshoe exists in the standard map for many parameter values, based on crude rigorous numerical calculations.

See also 
 Melnikov distance
 Equichordal point problem

References 

Dynamical systems
Theorems in complex analysis
Several complex variables